George Dougal (1 March 1875 – 1941) was a Scottish footballer who played in the Football League for Glossop and Manchester City and in the Scottish Football League for Hibernian.

References

1875 births
1941 deaths
Scottish footballers
English Football League players
Association football forwards
Hibernian F.C. players
Manchester City F.C. players
Glossop North End A.F.C. players